2+2 is an eponymous album of a vocal quartet called 2+2 with music by the Latin jazz ensemble known as Salsa Picante that was led by the American keyboardist/composer-arranger Clare Fischer. It was recorded in September 1980 and released in February 1981 by Pausa Records, and in Germany on the MPS label, as Foreign Exchange – The First Album. Tracks 1, 2, 3, 6 and 7 would be reissued on CD in 1999, and as a digital download in 2012, as Latin Patterns, a compilation of remastered highlights from four of Fischer's MPS LPs from this period.

The album represents a number of firsts for Fischer, including his first Grammy (specifically, the album's final track, "Guajira Pa' La Jeva", named 1981's Best Latin Recording), as well as a pair of recording debuts, first, that of 2+2, the vocal quartet with which Fischer supplemented his Latin jazz ensemble (thus tying together two key components of his wide-ranging musical universe), and, of equal if not greater import, that of his son Brent Fischer, marking the beginning of a fruitful – and more than three-decade-long – professional association.

Reception
Los Angeles Times jazz critic Leonard Feather awarded the album four stars, making particular note of the album's seamless blend of vocal and instrumental units:
Their blend is splendid, they are at times expertly integrated with the band through Fischer's compositions, lyrics and arrangements; and they are quadrilingual, starting in German and proceeding to English, Spanish and doo-be-doo, the Esperanto of jazz. The rhythm, generally timbales-oriented, could have used more bottom. Darlene Koldenhoven, the lead soprano, is a striking discovery.

Track listing
All songs composed by Clare Fischer except where noted.

Side A
 "Du, Du...." (trad./arr. Clare Fischer) – 5:57
 "Legacy" – 2:35
 "Morning" – 3:36
 "Guajira Pa' La Jeva" (words – Jose "Perico" Hernandez, music – Poncho Sanchez and Clare Fischer) – 4:30

Side B
 "Leavin'" – 3:25
 "Funquiado" – 6:46
 "Thru the Ages" – 4:21 
 "Melancolico" (words – Barbara Ransom, music – Clare Fischer) – 7:07

Personnel
Clare Fischer – leader, Fender-Rhodes electric piano, Yamaha EX-42 organ, Yamaha YC-30 combo organ
Gary Foster – flute and soprano sax; on side A (tracks 2 & 3) and side B (tracks 1 & 3) – sopranino and alto sax, plus sopranino, soprano, alto, tenor, bass and gran bass recorders
John Chiodini – electric guitar; on side A (tracks 2 & 3) and side B (tracks 1 & 3) – acoustic guitar and hollow-bodied electric guitar
Poncho Sanchez – conga, bongo, campana
Ramon Banda (only on side A, tracks 1 & 4, and side B, track 2 & 4) – clave
Alex Acuña (only on side A, tracks 1 & 4, and side B, track 2 & 4) – timbales, percussion
Roland Vazquez (only on side A, tracks 1 & 4, and side B, track 2 & 4) – drums 
Brent Fischer – electric bass
Oscar Meza – string bass
Luis Conte (only on side A, tracks 2 & 3, and side B, track 1 & 3) – timbales, percussion 
Andre Fischer (only on side A, tracks 2 & 3, and side B, track 1 & 3) – drums 
José "Perico" Hernandez – guest vocalist on A4 and B4
Darlene Koldenhoven – lead soprano
Mary Hylan – second soprano (sings lead on first bridge of "Morning," rock section of "Thru the Ages," and first part of "Guajira")
Amick Byram – tenor (solo on "Leavin'")
John Laird – baritone

References 

1981 albums
Albums arranged by Clare Fischer
Clare Fischer albums
Latin jazz albums by American artists
Pausa Records albums